Louco por Elas (English: Crazy About Them) is a Brazilian television sitcom that premiered on Rede Globo on March 13, 2012. It stars Eduardo Moscovis, Deborah Secco, Glória Menezes, Laura Barreto, and Luisa Arraes. The second season aired between October 30, 2012, and December 18, 2012, with eight episodes produced.

The third season premiered on January 22, 2013, and ended on June 25, 2013.

Plot

Leo (Eduardo Moscovis) is a beach soccer coach of an all-girl team who lives amid women. He lives in a big house with his lighthearted grandmother Violeta (Glória Menezes, witty teenage ex-stepdaughter Barbara (Luisa Arraes), and precocious daughter Theodora (Laura Barreto). Violeta's nutty attitude and open way of speaking keeps everyone in high spirits. She also manages to stage some of her wackiness whenever she finds it necessary in order to get her way. Theodora, the youngest member of the house, absolutely adores her grandmother and is the one who relates the most to her dreamy world. She is also very intelligent and constantly renders unexpected bold comments to everyone. Barbara's sweet nature isn't totally eclipsed by her typical teenage moodiness.

Leo is not only her soccer coach but also her father figure. She ended up living with him instead of with her mother Giovanna (Deborah Secco), but she never loses a chance to pick an argument with her ex-stepfather. As if dealing with all these women under the same roof weren't enough, Leo's ex-wife Giovanna is always around to stir things up. They decided to go their separate ways but hardly succeed in staying away from each other, since they are still in love and both daughters live with him. Giovanna is content with her thriving career as an author but suffers from the occasional guilt of having to juggle it with her role as a dedicated mother. Giovanna and Leo have an unresolved romantic issue between them which accounts for much jealousy and hilarious misconduct when it comes to each other's dating life.

Meanwhile, Leo's patience and sanity is put to test as he tries to deal with the many different women in his life, not to mention their contrasting problems and erratic behaviors. Caught in the middle of a parade of anxious soccer players, wacky family members, and potential girlfriends who come his way, Leo would have it no other way. In a comical attempt to satisfy their every whim, he renders an inside look at the souls of the women he adores in Crazy About Them.

Cast

Recurrent

Episodes

Reception

Ratings

Awards and nominations

References

Brazilian comedy television series
Portuguese-language television shows